DFW Airport North station is a TEXRail commuter rail station and future DART commuter rail station. It is located on Dallas/Fort Worth International Airport property in Grapevine, Texas.

Trinity Metro commuter rail station

Trinity Metro operates TEXRail from T&P Station in Fort Worth to DFW Airport/Terminal B station in Grapevine. The DFW Airport North station will provide transfers to the future DART Silver Line while serving employees of the airport, and promoting transit-oriented development. A bus loading and kiss-and-ride area (connected to the platforms via a pedestrian walkway) is located west of this station. After announcements that TEXRail was green-lit, DFW Airport has said that they will provide $40 million to operate only the DFW Airport/Terminal B station, leaving Trinity Metro to operate this station.

Revenue service commenced on January 10, 2019.

Gallery

References

External links
Dallas Area Rapid Transit
TEXRail

TEXRail stations
Airport railway stations in the United States
Railway stations in the United States opened in 2019
2019 establishments in Texas
Dallas/Fort Worth International Airport
Railway stations in Tarrant County, Texas
Dallas Area Rapid Transit commuter rail stations